The 2013-14 Elitserien was the seventh season of the Swedish bandy league Elitserien. The final was played at Friends Arena in Solna on 16 March 2014. Sandvikens AIK claimed the championship.

Teams

League table

Knock-out stage
A best-of-five playoff were used in the quarter-finals and semi-finals. The crucial final was played at Friends Arena in Solna, Stockholm on 16 March 2014.

Final

The championship trophy was handed over by Prince Daniel, Duke of Västergötland.

Season statistics

Top scorers

References

See also
 2013–14 in Swedish bandy

Elitserien (bandy) seasons
Bandy
Bandy
Elitserien
Elitserien